Downe Scout Activity Centre is one of the National Scout Activity Centres under the direct control of The Scout Association in Downe near Orpington, Greater London. It provides camping and indoor accommodations for Scouts and Guides.

In November 2020 the Scout Association announced their intention to sell the site. The Scout Association said it would do everything possible "to make sure that the legacies are honoured and heritage preserved"

In late July 2021 The Scout Association trustees unanimously agreed to sell the site to Friends of Downe Activity Centre, a Charitable Incorporated Organisation (Registered Charity Number 1194761). Friends of Downe Activity Centre will ensure that  future generations of young people are able to enjoy the site.

However in late October 2022, it was confirmed that the site would not be kept within the scouting movement, as the Scout Association have decided to sell to a housing developer instead.

History

Downe Camp, close to Orpington, opened in 1929 as a Scoutmasters' Training Ground. From 1933 it was available to Scout Groups and the site offered camping and some activities, including swimming. This was possible by the construction of a swimming pool which was funded by the proceeds from the very first Gang Show, which was organised by Ralph Reader for this very purpose.

Charles Darwin lived in the road along from Downe House and undertook his famous worm experiments on at least two areas of the site.

The site was supported by a committee one of whom was Sir Jeremiah Coleman, together with his wife, he donated money to build the Providor as their golden wedding anniversary gift. They also donated the clock from their stable block and paid for the tower around it.

Located adjacent to Biggin Hill Airport, Downe Scout Camp was used as a base for the Home Guard during World War II and required considerable efforts by working parties of Rover Scouts in the late 1940s to return it to a Scout camp ground.

Greater London South East Scouts assumed control and management of the site in 1987. However, in 2005, the site was renamed as Downe Activity Centre and became one of the National Scout Activity Centres under the direct control of The Scout Association.

The site was used as part of a Blue Peter special which aired on 20 February 2007 to promote the Scouting 2007 Centenary. Over 100 Cub Scouts, Scouts and Explorer Scouts were present on the camp, along with the TV crew who joined in with all of the activities.

A series of international camps called Campdowne have been held at the site, the first was in 1989, followed by 1992, 1996, 2000, 2004, 2008 and the most recent in 2013. Campdowne has been attended by Scouts and Guides from all over the world, set in both the woodland and open fields the camps offered a unique and unforgettable ten day programme of events and activities.

See also
Baden-Powell House
Gilwell Park
Summer camp
Youlbury Scout Activity Centre

References

External links

Downe Activity Centre 

Scout Activity Centres of The Scout Association
London Borough of Bromley